Monument is the seventh studio album by German rapper Kollegah, released on 7 December 2018 through his own label Alpha Music Empire. The album is Kollegah's first solo album since 2016's Imperator. The double album also included his tenth mixtape Hoodtape Volume 3.

Background and release
Kollegah released his third collaborative studio album alongside German rapper Farid Bang, Jung Brutal Gutaussehend 3, in December 2017. The album became an immediate success for them, debuting on the pole positions in German-speaking Europe and being certified platinum by the Bundesverband Musikindustrie (BVMI) and gold by the IFPI Austria. Following a controversy about antisemitic lyrics on the bonus EP §185, both rappers released Platin war gestern in August 2018.

Kollegah announced Monument on 1 October 2018. It was released by Alpha Music Empire, Kollegah's record label. On 1 October 2018, the limited box set was made available to pre-order on Amazon for €43.99.

Track listing
Credits adapted from Spotify.

Charts

Weekly charts

Year-end charts

References

2018 albums
Kollegah albums